Climate of the Hunter is a 2019 American horror film directed by Mickey Reece, who co-wrote the film with John Selvidge. It stars Mary Buss and Ginger Gilmartin as sisters Elizabeth and Alma, who attempt to reconnect with their friend Wesley (Ben Hall), who may or may not be a vampire, after twenty years apart.

The film premiered at Fantastic Fest in Austin, Texas in September 2019. It received a limited theatrical release on December 18, 2020, followed by a wider video-on-demand and digital release on January 12, 2021.

Cast

Release
Climate of the Hunter premiered at Fantastic Fest in Austin, Texas in September 2019. It later screened at the Nashville Film Festival on October 9, 2019. In 2020, the film screened in Quebec, Canada as part of the Fantasia International Film Festival.

Distributor Dark Star Pictures released the film in select venues on December 18, 2020, followed by a wider video-on-demand and digital release on January 12, 2021.

Reception
The site's critical consensus reads, "Strong direction and an arresting sense of visual style make the vampire love triangle Climate of the Hunter a balmy treat for fans of off-kilter horror."

Leigh Monson of Birth. Movies. Death. called Climate of the Hunter "a film dripping in sensuously mysterious atmosphere, but instead of drowning its characters in absurdity like an overdressed salad, it uses its director's bizarre proclivities as a garnish to a relatable, more readily consumable story." Rachel Reeves of Rue Morgue called the film "a surreal cinematic treat that gleefully walks the fine line between trippy arthouse and bemusement with ease. An unquestionably unique entry in the heavily saturated vampire genre, its greatest trick may lie in the question of whether it's actually a vampire film at all."

References

External links
 
 

2010s English-language films
American horror films
2019 films
2019 horror films
American vampire films
2010s American films